Tardieu may refer to:
Ambroise Tardieu (1788–1841) French engraver and cartographer.
André Tardieu (1876–1945), three times Prime Minister of France (between 1929 and 1932)
 Auguste Ambroise Tardieu (1818–1879), forensic medical scientist of the mid 19th century; President of the French Academy of Medicine, Dean of the Faculty of Medicine and Professor of Legal Medicine at the University of Paris
Élisabeth-Claire Tardieu (1731-1773), French engraver
 Jacques-Nicolas Tardieu (1716–1791), French engraver
 Jean Tardieu (1903–1995), French artist, musician, poet and dramatic author
 Jean-Charles Tardieu (1765–1830), French painter
Pierre François Tardieu (1711–1771), French engraver and cartographer.
Marie-Anne Tardieu (1732–1826), married name of Marie-Anne Rousselet, French engraver
 Marie Laure Tardieu (1902–1998), French botanist 
 Michel Tardieu (born 1938), French scholar
 Nicolas-Henri Tardieu (1674–1749), French engraver
 Pierre Alexandre Tardieu (1756-1844), French engraver